Mountain Monsters is an American cryptozoology-themed reality television series airing on Travel Channel. It originally premiered on June 22, 2013  on Destination America. The series follows the Appalachian Investigators of Mysterious Sightings (A.I.M.S.) team, a band of seven native West Virginian hunters and trappers, as they research and track unidentified creatures in the Appalachian Mountains. There is also a side-series titled Mountain Monsters: By The Fire that features extra facts and never-before-seen footage from different episodes of the series.

The series aired for five seasons on Destination America. After an 18-month hiatus, it was announced that the series was renewed for a sixth season and would be moving to Travel Channel.

In 2021 it was announced that a TV special titled Mountain Monsters: A  Tribute to Trapper would premiere on January 3, 2021. It was also announced that the seventh season will premiere on January 10, 2021. It was announced shortly after the premiere of Season 7, that new episodes would only release exclusively on the Discovery+ streaming platform for the rest of the season.

The official Mountain Monsters Instagram account revealed on December 10, 2021 that an eighth season would premiere in January 2022. Season 9 celebrates its tenth anniversary.

Premise 
The A.I.M.S. team is a self-styled, cryptozoology research team founded by West Virginians John "Trapper" Tice, Jeff Headlee, and Willy McQuillian. Their goal is to prove the existence of mysterious creatures such as Bigfoot, Wampus cat, Grafton Monster, Spearfinger, Werewolf, Hellhound, Lizard Man, and Mothman.  The episodes normally begin with Trapper, Jeff, Huckleberry, and Buck discussing the specific creature they are hunting on the way to the location where the creature was spotted. They then meet with eyewitnesses who have encountered the creature, giving the team an idea of where to conduct an initial night investigation to find evidence of the creature being in the area.

After concluding their initial night hunt, Willy and Wild Bill begin work on a trap to contain the creature while the rest of the team searches for more evidence, meeting with additional eyewitnesses who normally possess photographic, video, or audio evidence of the creature. After testing the completed trap the team begins the final night hunt.

The creatures are, supposedly, occasionally caught on camera, such as the Cave Creature, Chupacabra, Wildman (Bigfoot), Waya Woman and Smoke Wolf's eyes. They are also shown as a digital rendering that appears before and after commercial breaks. The team attempts to capture these creatures (with Hogzilla, three Devil Dogs and two wolves from the Tygart Valley being their most recent trapped creatures). In some instances, the team places trail cameras and/or infrared camcorders near the trap to capture photographic evidence of the creature in question. They have caught fleeting, blurry images of what they claim to be the Grassman, Shadow Creature, Cherokee Death Cat, Black Wolf and the Bigfoot from the Tygart Valley on camera, to name but a few. More recently a recurring rogue team has spied on and sabotaged the A.I.M.S. team and their investigations. But the Rogue Team did not have much involvement in the show's 6th season, which focused more on the team hunting monsters like in the earlier seasons.

As of the 7th season, Trapper has died, and the rest of the team continues to hunt creatures in his legacy.

Cast members

Production 
Prior to the season six premiere, John "Trapper" Tice announced that he would have limited involvement due to a myriad of serious health issues. He made a minor appearance in the first episode of the season where he was visited by Huckleberry and Buck to whom he expressed the severity of his situation. He made one more brief appearance in the season's eighth episode. Tice died on December 16, 2019.

Series overview

Episodes

Season 1 (2013)

Season 2 (2014)

Season 3: Bigfoot Edition (2015)

Season 4: Bigfoot Edition (2016)

Season 5: Secrets of the Dark Forest (2017)

Season 6: The Quest for Spearfinger (2019)

Season 7: The Mission from Trapper (2021)

Season 8: Tygart Valley Mysteries (2022)

Season 9 (2023)

Finding Bigfoot "feud" 
On April 5, 2015, Matt Moneymaker of Finding Bigfoot tweeted that Mountain Monsters was scripted and the A.I.M.S. team were merely actors. "Trapper" John Tice responded to the tweet, denying that he was an actor and referring to Moneymaker's show as "Losing Bigfoot". The online feud has continued with Finding Bigfoot castmember Cliff Barackman chiming in that the show is "fiction" and the official Finding Bigfoot Twitter account calling Mountain Monsters a "fake-hoax" show in regards to the series' April 2017 return.

References

External links 
 

2013 American television series debuts
2010s American reality television series
2020s American reality television series
Cryptozoological television series
Destination America original programming
English-language television shows
Travel Channel original programming